Task Force O was the naval component responsible for landing troops at Omaha Beach during the Normandy Landings, June 6, 1944. Bombarding Force C, also part of Task Force O was the group responsible for supporting gunfire to the landings. Unless otherwise noted, all ships belonged to the United States Navy or United States Coast Guard.

Assault Group O1
 APA/LSI(L) Unit
 APA 26 USS Samuel Chase
 LCVP x26
 APA 45 USS Henrico
 LCVP x26
  SS Empire Anvil – British LSI(L)
 LCA x18
 LST Unit
 LST 309
 LST 314
 LST 357
 LST 373
 LST 374
 LST 376
 Landing Craft
 LCI(L) x5
 LCM x18
 LCT x53
 Others
 LCC 10
 LCC 20

Assault Group O2
 APA/LSI(L) Unit
 APA 28 USS Charles Carroll
 LCVP x26
 APA 30 USS Thomas Jefferson
 LCVP x26
 LSI(L) SS Empire Javelin – Royal Navy
 LCA x18
 LST Unit
 LST 310
 LST 315
 LST 316
 LST 317
 LST 332
 LST 372
 Landing Craft
 LCI(L) x17
 LCM x18
 LCT x54
 Others
 LCC 30
 LCC 40
 LCC 50

Assault Group O3
 AP Unit
 AP 67 USS Dorothea L. Dix
 LCVP x26
 AP 76 USS Anne Arundel
 LCVP x26
 AP 77 USS Thurston
 LCVP x26
 LST Unit
 LST 6
 LST 51
 LST 75
 LST 133
 LST 134
 LST 157
 LST 285
 LST 286
 LST 347
 LST 350
 LST 375
 LST 502
 Landing Craft
 LCI(L) x11
 LCT x39
 Others
 HMS Oceanway –  Royal Navy dock landing ship

Assault Group O4
 LSI(S) Unit – Royal Navy
 SS Prince Baudoin LSI(S)
 LCA x8
 SS Prince Charles LSI(S)
 LCA x8
 LSI(S) SS Prince Leopold
 LCA x8
 LSI(H) Unit – Royal Navy
 SS Amsterdam
 LCA x8
 LSI(H) SS Ben My Cree
 LCA x8
 LSI(H) SS Princess Maud
 LCA x8

Support Group
 LCF x7
 LCG (Large) x5
 LCP(L) Smoke x28
 LCT (Armored) x8
 LCT (High Explosive) x10
 LCT (Rocket) x9

Patrol Craft
 PC 552
 PC 553
 PC 564
 PC 565
 PC 568
 PC 576
 PC 617
 PC 618

Anti-Submarine Trawlers
 HMS Bressay – Royal Navy
 HMS Coll – Royal Navy
 HMS Sky – Royal Navy

Minesweeper Group
 Sweep Unit 1 (4th Minesweeper Flotilla) – Royal Navy
 
 HMS Elgin
 HMS Kellett
 HMS Lydd
 HMS Pangbourne
 
 
 
 HMS Sutton
 Sweep Unit 2 (31st Minesweeper Flotilla) – Royal Canadian Navy
 HMCS Blairmore
 HMCS Caraquet
 
 HMCS Fort William
 HMCS Malpeque
 HMCS Milltown
 
 HMCS Mulgrave
 HMCS Wasaga
 Sweep Unit 3 (167th Minesweeper Flotilla) – Royal Navy (BYMS-class minesweepers)
 BYMS 2050
 BYMS 2061
 BYMS 2069
 BYMS 2154
 BYMS 2155
 BYMS 2156
 BYMS 2182
 BYMS 2210
 BYMS 2255
 BYMS 2256
 Sweep Unit 4 (104th Minesweeper Flotilla) – Royal Navy
 MMS 31
 MMS 37
 MMS 74
 MMS 75
 MMS 84
 MMS 86
 MMS 260
 MMS 279
 MMS 280
 MMS 305
 Attached Motor Launches – Royal Navy
 ML 118
 ML 153
 ML 163
 ML 187
 ML 189
 ML 194
 ML 214
 ML 230
 ML 448
 ML 907
 HDML 1383
 HDML 1387

Abbreviations
 AP/APA – Attack Transport
 BYMS – British Yard Mine Sweeper
 HDML – Harbour Defence Motor Launch
 LCA – Landing Craft Assault
 LCC – Landing Craft Control
 LCI(L) – Landing Craft Infantry (Large)
 LCG – Landing Craft Gun (see Landing craft#Special craft)
 LCF – Landing Craft Flak, a landing craft fitted with anti-aircraft guns
 LCM – Landing Craft Mechanized
 LCT – Landing Craft Tank
 LCT (Armored) – Landing Craft Tank (Armored) (see Landing craft tank#Conversions and modifications)
 LCT (High Explosive) – Landing Craft Tank (High Explosive) – landing craft carrying self-propelled guns (see Landing craft tank#Conversions and modifications)
 LCT (Rocket) – Landing Craft Tank (Rocket)
 LCVP – Landing Craft, Vehicle, Personnel
 LSD – Landing Ship Dock
 LSI(H) – Landing Ship Infantry (Hand-Hoist)
 LSI(L) – Landing Ship Infantry (Large)
 LSI(S) – Landing Ship Infantry (Small)
 LST – Landing Ship Tank
 MMS – Motor Minesweeper

References
 

Operation Overlord
Omaha, List of ships and craft
Military history of Normandy
World War II operations and battles of Europe
Battles and operations of World War II
Battles of World War II involving the United States
Battles of World War II involving the United Kingdom
Battles of World War II involving Canada
Lists of World War II ships